Northern Birifor or Malba Birifor is a Gur language of the Niger–Congo family. It is spoken by a few hundred thousand people, mainly in the southwest of Burkina Faso, particularly in the provinces of Bougouriba, Ioba, Noumbiel and Poni and in western Ivory Coast.

Phonology

Vowels

Consonants

Orthography
It is written in this alphabet:

Long vowels are written double but without doubling the nasal tilde, e.g.  for

References

Oti–Volta languages
Gur languages
Languages of Burkina Faso
Languages of Ivory Coast